Anastasia Pavlyuchenkova and Lucie Šafářová were the defending champions, but Pavlyuchenkova chose not to participate this year.
Šafářová played alongside Kristina Mladenovic and successfully defended the title, defeating Andrea Hlaváčková and Liezel Huber in the final 6–3, 7–6(8–6).

Seeds

Draw

Draw

External links
 Main draw

Family Circle Cup - Doubles
Charleston Open